Foster Brook is a census-designated place in Foster Township, McKean County in the state of Pennsylvania, United States. The community is just north of Bradford, along Pennsylvania Route 346. As of the 2010 census the population was 1,251 residents.

Demographics

References

Census-designated places in McKean County, Pennsylvania
Census-designated places in Pennsylvania